Barbara Sheldon (November 24, 1912 – October 19, 2007) was an American film actress of the early 1930s.  She started her film career in 1933 in Stolen by Gypsies or Beer and Bicycles, and starred in two other films that same year. Her best known role was when she starred opposite John Wayne in the 1934 film The Lucky Texan. She was able to land the role due to her excellent horsemanship. It would be her last film. With no other roles coming her way, she retired from acting. She died at the age of 94 on October 19, 2007.

Although her IMDb biography lists her birthplace as Kalamazoo, MI, her newspaper biography for The Lucky Texan says she was born in New Orleans, where she also learned to ride, and had hopes of becoming a jockey. She later moved to Hartford, Connecticut where she performed with Jimmy Thatcher's theater troupe.

Filmography
 Stolen by Gypsies or Beer and Bicycles (1933)
 Fits in a Fiddle (1933)
 Flying Down to Rio (1933) (uncredited)
 The Lucky Texan (1934)

References

External links
 
 

1912 births
2007 deaths
American film actresses
20th-century American actresses
Western (genre) film actresses
21st-century American women